Tiguent is a small town and commune in south-western Mauritania, not far from the coast.  In 2000 it had a population of 12,170.

Transport 

It is proposed to be served by a new station on railway to serve the phosphate mines at Kaedi.

See also 
 Transport in Mauritania
 Railway stations in Mauritania

References 

Communes of Mauritania